Sebastian Starkl (born 21 January 1996) is an Austrian footballer who plays for Kremser SC.

References

External links
 

1996 births
Living people
Austrian footballers
SKN St. Pölten players
Association football midfielders
People from Krems an der Donau
Footballers from Lower Austria